The 2005 Canadian National Challenge Cup was won by Scarborough G.S. United

October 10, 2005 in Edmonton, Alberta.
Scarborough GS United 3 (Calixterio, T. Kouzmanis, Haitham)
Edmonton Green and Gold 2 (Korthuij, Diaz)
HT: Att: Ref: John De la Cruz

Rosters

Portuguese Sporting Club

Edmonton Green & Gold 

Edmonton (Squad): Jordan Robinson, Devon Fraser, Jarin Myskiw, Neil Morrow, Jamie Belous, Troy Hart,
Kenny Nutt, Damir Jesic, Nikola Vignjevic, Jordan Gillespie, Mark Korthuis, Ben Drummond, Sam Lam,
Vikray Kaushail, Quenton Zalazar, Brett Bacheln, Ian Diaz, Erit Pinnell, Herman Braich, Matteo Saccomano.

Scarborough G.S. United 
Scarboro (Squad): Courtney Campbell, Courtney Brown, Tony Marshall, Valentine Anozie, Emil Calixterio,
Ryan Dummett, Decio Rego, Thomas Kouzmanis, Jonathan Westmass, Sultan Haitham,
Shawn Long, Ron Belfon, Lyndon Hooper, John Williams, Wayne Morgan, Jermaine Coleman, Shaun Griffith, Richard Kirwan, Gus Kouzmanis, Lester Bruno.

Canadian National Challenge Cup
Canadian
Nat
Sport in Edmonton